Cedric Waters Hill (3 April 1891 – 5 March 1975) was an Australian officer in the Royal Flying Corps and later the Royal Air Force who, together with E. H. Jones, escaped from the Yozgat prisoner of war camp in Turkey during the First World War. Their epic story was told in Jones' book The Road to En-dor and in his own book The Spook and the Commandant.

Between February 1917 and October 1918, Jones and Hill convinced their Turkish captors that they were mediums adept at the Ouija board. Taking advantage of the greed of the Turkish camp Commandant, with promises of buried treasure via the Ouija board, the two men managed to engineer the circumstances of their imprisonment to favour their escape. Eventually they convinced their gaolers to repatriate them by feigning insanity, arriving home only a few months before the Armistice.

Hill continued his career in the RAF after the war. Granted a short service commission as a flying officer on 6 December 1920, he was promoted flight lieutenant in January 1923 and appointed to a permanent commission six months later. He was advanced to squadron leader in 1931. Hill commanded No. 1 Squadron from October 1934 to January 1936 and again from December that year until April 1937. That same month, he was promoted to wing commander and appointed to command RAF Tangmere. He was made an acting group captain from 1 June 1940, during the Second World War, and retired from the RAF in 1944. Hill then worked as a ferry pilot for the Air Transport Auxiliary.

On 5 March 1975, Hill died at his home in Windsor, Berkshire. He was survived by his wife and daughter.

References

Further reading
The Road to En-dor, E. H. Jones, 1921, John Lane the Bodley Head ltd., London
The Spook and the Commandant, C,W Hill, 1975, William Kimber,

External links
 
The road to En-dor at the Internet Archive

1891 births
1975 deaths
World War I prisoners of war held by the Ottoman Empire
British Army personnel of World War I
Royal Flying Corps officers
British World War I prisoners of war
British escapees
Escapees from Turkish detention
British World War I pilots
Royal Air Force officers
Air Transport Auxiliary pilots